The 2010 Atlantic Coast Conference baseball tournament was held at NewBridge Bank Park in Greensboro, North Carolina, from May 26 through 30. The #5 seeded Florida State Seminoles won the tournament and earned the Atlantic Coast Conference's automatic bid to the 2010 NCAA Division I baseball tournament. It was Florida State's fifth ACC tournament win and first since 2004. A record 6,247 were in attendance for the championship game.

2010 was the fourth year in which the conference used a round-robin tournament format, with the team with the best record in each group at the end of the three-game round robin advancing to a one-game championship.

Seeding Procedure
From TheACC.com:
The top two teams from both the Atlantic and Coastal divisions, as determined by conference winning percentage, in addition to the four teams with the next best conference winning percentage, regardless of division, will be selected to participate in the ACC Baseball Championship. The two division champions will automatically be seeded number one and two based on winning percentage in overall conference competition. The remaining teams will be seeded (three through eight) based on winning percentage in overall conference competition without regard to division. All ties will be broken using the tie-breaking provisions .

Tournament

Notes
† - Denotes extra innings
‡ - Denotes game shortened due to mercy rule
1 - Florida State beat Virginia head-to-head
2 - NC State beat Virginia Tech head-to-head

Results

Division A

1 - Game ended in the bottom of the seventh inning due to the Mercy Rule.

Division B

1 - Game ended after the bottom of the seventh inning due to the Mercy Rule.

Championship final

All-Tournament Team

Source: theacc.com

See also
College World Series
NCAA Division I Baseball Championship

References

Tournament
Atlantic Coast Conference baseball tournament
Atlantic Coast Conference baseball tournament
Atlantic Coast Conference baseball tournament
Baseball in North Carolina
College sports in North Carolina
History of Greensboro, North Carolina
Sports competitions in Greensboro, North Carolina